Gideon Okeke is a Nigerian actor, model, and TV Presenter. He came to the public eye in 2006 when he appeared as a contestant on the first edition of Big Brother Nigeria. In 2008, Gideon joined the cast of the M-NET TV series Tinsel on which he is a regular to date.

Early life and education
An only child, Gideon grew up in Ajegunle, one of the slums of Lagos, a place he speaks so fondly of. He attended Nnamdi Azikiwe University where he studied applied bio-chemistry. He later enrolled at the Lee Strasberg Institute in New York where he obtained professional training in acting.

Career

Television work
After appearing in the first edition of Big Brother Nigeria, Gideon joined the cast of M-NET daytime series Tinsel, as Phillip Ade Williams, the arrogant son of a media mogul. He remains one of the longest-serving actors on the show. Gideon has also appeared on the South African TV series Jacobs cross. In 2014, he played the role of Bernard in the irokotv series Poisoned Bait, directed by BAFTA LA award-winning director Leila Djansi. In addition, Gideon was the host of the DSTV game show Money Drop.

Film
Gideon landed his first lead role in the Nigerian drama film Relentless in 2010, starring alongside Jimmy Jean-Louis and Nneka Egbuna. His second lead role was in the 2014 crime thriller A Place in the Stars. In the same year, he played the role of Tobena, the love interest of the lead character in the romantic comedy When Love Happens. Other films to his credit include the caper crime comedy Gbomo Gbomo Express and the Ghanaian romantic drama Anniversary. In 2016 he was cast in the drama thriller 93 Days. Starring alongside Danny Glover, Gideon received an AMVCA nomination for his portrayal of Dr. Morris Ibeawuchi, one of the surviving doctors of the Nigerian Ebola crisis.

Stage
Gideon has appeared in several stage productions including Fractures, an adaptation of Arthur Miller's A View From The Bridge. He also played Fela Kuti in Fela.. Arrest The Music, is a musical that celebrates the talent of the Nigerian Afrobeat legend. Gideon is also a cast member of Saro The Musical 2, currently touring London.

Personal life
Gideon is a single father to daughter born in March 2016.

Filmography

Stage plays

Television

Films

Awards and nominations

See also
 Tinsel (TV series)
 List of Nigerian actors

References

Living people
21st-century Nigerian male actors
Male actors from Lagos
Nigerian male film actors
Nigerian male stage actors
Nigerian male television actors
Nnamdi Azikiwe University alumni
Igbo actors
1983 births
Nigerian television presenters
Big Brother (franchise) contestants
Nigerian television personalities
Nigerian male models
20th-century births